The Barnabites, officially named as the Clerics Regular of Saint Paul, are a religious order of clerics regular founded in 1530 in the Catholic Church. They are associated with the Angelic Sisters of St. Paul and the members of the Barnabite lay movement.

Establishment of the Order 
Second in seniority of the orders of regular clerics (the Theatines being first), the Barnabites were founded in Milan,  by Anthony Mary Zaccaria, Barthélemy Ferrari, and Jacopo Antonio Morigia. The region was then suffering severely from the wars between Charles V and Francis I, and Zaccaria saw the need for radical reform of the Church in Lombardy, afflicted by problems typical for that era: dioceses without a bishop, clergy with inadequate theological training, a decrease in religious practice, and monasteries and convents in decline.

It was approved by Pope Clement VII in the brief Vota per quae vos on 18 February 1533. Later approvals gave it the status of a Religious Order, but it is still normally referred to as a congregation. Both the date and the vocation place it among the Orders associated with the Counter-Reformation. Zaccaria's holiness moved many to reform their lives but it also moved many to oppose him. Twice his community had to undergo an official religious investigation, and twice it was exonerated.

The order was given the name of "Regular Clerics of St. Paul" (Clerici Regulares Sancti Pauli). In 1538 the grand old monastery of Saint Barnabas by the city wall of Milan was given to the congregation as their main seat, and thenceforth they were known by the popular name of Barnabites. After the death of Zaccaria in 1539, the congregation was favoured and protected by Archbishop Charles Borromeo of Milan and later by Francis de Sales because of their successful missionary work in Upper Italy. Charles Borromeo presided, in 1579, as Cardinal Protector, over the commission which wrote the Constitutions of the Order. The General Chapters of the Order were regularly held at Milan until the reign of Pope Alexander VII (1655–67), who ordered them to convene in Rome. Pope Innocent XI (1676–89), however, finally decreed that they should be held in Rome and Milan alternately.

These assemblies of the Provincial Superiors were held every three years for the election of a new Superior General, whose term of office was limited to that period, only one re-election being allowed to each incumbent of the office.

The Society started pastoral activity among the working classes and in monasteries. In the early 17th century, the Barnabites gradually entered the field of education – work which was to remain a mark of their apostolate. They entered France under Henry IV in 1608, and Austria under Ferdinand II in 1626.

The present Constitution is an updated version dated 1983, which takes into account the changes from the Second Vatican Council. There is a female branch of Religious Sisters, the Angelic Sisters of St. Paul, found by Anthony Mary Zaccaria, and an organization for lay people, the Laity of St. Paul, originally called the Married of St. Paul and sometimes referred to in North America as the Oblates of St. Paul.

As of July 24, 2012, the new Superior General is a Brazilian, the Very Rev. Francisco Chagas Santos da Silva.

Character of the Order 
As indicated by the official name of the order, the work of the Barnabites is inspired by St. Paul the Apostle. In an address in 2000, to the institute’s General Chapter, Pope John Paul II noted, "[I]n pointing out the ideal of religious and apostolic life to his spiritual sons, St Anthony Mary Zaccaria emphasized charity."

The members of the Order make, in addition to the three standard religious vows of poverty, chastity, and obedience, a fourth vow never to strive for any office or position of dignity, or to accept such otherwise than under a command of the Holy See.

The focus of the goals of the Barnabite Order, besides preaching in general, catechizing, hearing confessions, giving missions, ministrations in hospitals and prisons, and the education of youth, includes also a particular devotion to the thorough study and exposition of St. Paul's Epistles. Their habit is the black soutane which formed the usual garb of Milanese secular priests in the time of Borromeo. He himself was not a member but is venerated by the Barnabites as a secondary patron saint of their Order.

The first missions undertaken by the Order were in Italy, France, the former Duchy of Savoy, Austria and Bohemia. In the 18th century, they started missions in China and Brazil. Today, they serve in 15 countries. Until 2021 they were active in Afghanistan, where they had run the Afghan Catholic Mission since 1933, interrupted only while the Taliban regime was in power.

Barnabite saints 
Three Barnabites are counted among the canonized saints: Anthony Maria Zaccaria, Alexander Sauli and Francis Bianchi, while some others are being investigated for possible canonization, including the Venerable Karl Schilling, the only post-Reformation Norwegian to be officially considered for sainthood, and the Italian physician and priest Vittorio De Marino. Vincenzo Sangermano was a Barnabite who was a missionary in Burma and wrote multiple books about the Burmese people.

The Order has also numbered several cardinals, the first of these being Giacomo Antonio Morigia, one of its founders, raised to the cardinalate in 1699.

John Bellarini, who was the Visitor of the Order and twice held the office of Assistant Superior General, was also a noted theologian who wrote a number of works including an influential commentary on the Council of Trent.

References

External links 
- Paroquia São Rafael - São Paulo - Brazil

 
1530 establishments in Europe
Religious organizations established in the 1530s
Christian religious orders established in the 16th century